Liège Cathedral, otherwise St. Paul's Cathedral, Liège, is a Roman Catholic cathedral in Liège, Belgium. Founded in the 10th century, it was rebuilt from the 13th to the 15th century and restored in the mid-19th century. It became a Catholic cathedral in the 19th century due to the destruction of Saint Lambert's Cathedral in 1795. It is the seat of the Diocese of Liège.

St. Paul's Cathedral 
During the French Revolution the ancient cathedral of Liège, St. Lambert's, was destroyed.  After the revolution the former collegiate church of St. Paul's was elevated in rank, becoming the current Liège Cathedral.

History 

The present cathedral was formerly one among the Seven collegiate churches of Liège – St. Peter's, Holy Cross, St. Paul's, St. John's, St. Denis's, St. Martin's and St. Bartholomew's – which until the Liège Revolution of 1789 together comprised the "secondary clergy" of the First Estate in the Prince-bishopric of Liège (the "primary clergy" being the canons of St. Lambert's cathedral).

Origin and buildings

Saint-Germain Chapel 
In 967, Bishop Eraclus built this church. The basilica was raised only up to the windows when Eraclus died. He instituted a college of twenty canons to whom Notger, who completed the building begun by his predecessor, added ten more.

Saint-Calixte Chapel 
The hamlet formed on the island had rapidly expanded, so much so that a second chapel had to be built a short distance from the first one. It was dedicated to Callixtus I, Pope and martyr. The chroniclers attribute its foundation to Pirard, 36th bishop of Liège and added that he established twelve Benedictine monasteries, the only order then existing in the county of Liège.

Saint Paul Collegiate 
It was upon his return from Cologne, where he had attended the funeral of Bruno the Great, archbishop of that city and vicar of the empire, that Eraclus conceived the project of building a church in honor of Paul the Apostle.

First allocations 
Very little information remains concerning the goods which Eraclus endowed the college with twenty canons which he had created.

Notger solemnly consecrated this church on 7 May 972: two altars were dedicated to Germanus of Auxerre and St. Calixte, in memory of the worship previously rendered to these two saints in the chapels which had been dedicated to them. On 21 April 980, the fortress of Chèvremont was destroyed from top to bottom and the churches that were there demolished. One of them, dedicated to St. Caprasius, had a college of ten priests; the bishop gathered them together with the twenty canons of St. Paul and thus brought their number to thirty. All the property, pensions and tithes of St. Capraise were transferred to the new collegiate church, to which Notger gave the bell called "Dardar", also from Chèvremont.

Building

The apse, constructed in the 14th century in the Rayonnant style, is pentagonal. The choir, the transept, the main nave and the side naves date from the 13th century and have all the characteristics of Gothic architecture of that period. Later Gothic architecture occurs in the windows of the transept and of the nave, the side chapels and the tower. The upper gallery overloaded with pinnacle hooks is modern, as is the storey with the ogival windows and the spire of the belltower with four bells on each side. The lintel of the portal bears an inscription, formerly on the city seal: Sancta Legia Ecclesiae Romanae Filia ("Holy Liège, daughter of the Roman church").

First known provost and deans 
Godescalc
The first authentic mention of a dean and provost of St. Paul can be found in a piece from the year 1083, taken from the cartulary of this Collegiate Church. It talks about damages caused in the alleu of Nandrin, property of the chapter, by Giselbert, Count of Clermont, and his accomplice Frédelon. Bishop Henri de Verdun embraced the defence of the Church's rights and in order to safeguard them in the future, the advocatus of Nandrin's alleu was entrusted to a lord named Conon. This ceremony took place in the temple itself, on St. Paul's Day.

A document from the following year attests to the existence of a cloister at that time and that the brothers of St. Paul were called canons.

In 1086, Godescalc instituted several benefits (Eleemosynœ or Prebetidulœ). They were known for a long time as prebends of Wouteringhen or Wohange. This same year, he founded the altar of saints John the Baptist, Nicolas and Mary Magdalene. It's the oldest simple profit establishment we've ever had.

In 1101, Dean Godescalc was elevated to the dignity of Archdeacon of Liège, and died shortly afterwards.

Waselin
In 1106, the Collegiale added to its properties part of the territory of Fragnée, acquired and shared by Obert between the churches of the secondary clergy. To celebrate his birthday, on 24 March 1113, Wazelin donated to Saint-Paul his house with all its outbuildings.

The latter rented the tithes of the church of Wendeshem for a rent of 5 Marcs of good money payable in Liège.

New allocations 
Godfrey I, Count of Louvain, in 1135, ceded the tithes of the city of Weert and its uncultivated or cultivated territory to the Collegiate chapter.

In 1182, Dean Henry donated the parish church of Laminne to the chapter, which would keep it until it was abolished by the National Convention on 20 March 1797. He then bequeathed to the collegiate church the land of Hodimont.

Ebalus became dean in 1185: in the same year, a letter mentions the transfer of the church of Hermalle-sous-Huy, to the Flône Abbey. He gave to the collegiate the church of Lavoir, dedicated to Hubertus, whose St. Paul's chapter kept the collation until 1797.

Pope Celestine III, by a diploma given in Rome on 14 April 1188, confirmed all its possessions to the church of Liège.

Dean Jonah gave the collegiate to the church of St. George's and the church of Verlaine dedicated to St. Remy in 1198.

Foundation of Val-Benoit and Val des écoliers 
Othon Des Prez, elected dean, founded the convent of Sart in 1220, on the left bank of the river Meuse, half a lieue away from the town, and five years later it was renamed the convent of Sart, which was renamed the convent of Val-Benoît, when Cardinal-Legat Conrad, Bishop of Porto consecrated the church on the day of Pentecost. He then had the priory of Val-Notre-Dame erected in Liège, in a place then called Gravière (now La Gravioule) and in Saint-Martin-en-Ile, he raised and endowed, with his own money, an altar in honour of Thomas Becket of Canterbury.

New collegiate church 
The construction of the new building was probably hampered by a lack of funds and progress was slow. The tower seems to have been finished first; in 1275 the dean Guillaume de Fraynoir had two large bells given by him suspended: one, in honour of the patron saint of the church, was named Paula, and the other Concordia, the name of the mother of this apostle. Cast in July 1275, they announced the services celebrated by the dean. The second of these bells, Concordia, was still ringing in the 19th century; it rang the D of the organs and bore an inscription in Gothic letters.

Consecration
Everything leads us to believe that the reconstruction of the collegiate church was very advanced in 1289; indeed, on 11 April, both the consecration of the church and the blessing of the altars took place; solemnities celebrated by the two suffragans of Liège, Edmont, bishop of Courland in Livonia, and brother Bonaventure, of the Order of Citeaux, bishop of Céa.

Floods, fires and earthquakes 
Floods
The coal mines surrounding Liège from the Early Middle Ages, despite the prohibition of digging under the town which was not always respected, digging downstream and upstream had the consequence of making Liège a basin and later a dyke. Despite the ramparts, floods followed one another from century to century.

On 4 January 1374, the river Meuse grew so big that the island's neighbourhood was flooded as well as the collegiate church of St. Paul to the point where it could only be entered by boat.

On 28 January 1408, a flood also damaged the books and jewellery in the crypt, part of the charters, the books, and the ornaments of the collegiate church kept in the treasury. To avoid similar disasters, the floor of the new bookshop was raised and one entered from there by a few steps.

Heavy flooding occurred in 1464. The snow had fallen in abundance for several days before the feast of St.Caprasius of Agen, the rains which followed brought such a flood that on the day after the feast of St. Élisabeth, the swollen floods of the Meuse threatened to invade the collegiate church. The canons only had time to block the door with a kind of dam and had to buy a boat to go to the matins. They used the same means to attend the hours until 23 November, when they were able to go to the services on dry foot.

On 7 February 1571 as a result of a flood, the water rose to a height of 6.40 meters. The memory of this overflow is preserved by the following chronogram engraved on the right pillar of the collegial background next to the jubé. The line indicating the height of the water is 0.84 cm from the current level of the paving stone.
 

On 15 January 1643, the flood that swept away the Pont des Arches covered the Latin Quarter of Liège and caused immense damage. The waters of the river Meuse rose in St. Paul's church 1.35 meters above the current paving stone. The memory of this event is remembered by the following chronogram engraved on the pillar that supports the tower to the right of the jubé.
 

A metal plaque dating from 1926 is located to the right of the cathedral entrance indicating the height of the water at the time of the last flood.  Since the installation of the mud and water drain from downstream and upstream sewers, no further flooding has occurred.

Fires
During the night of 6 April 1456, a fire broke out in the room where the rector of the schools was sleeping. Fortunately, it had no consequences.

Earthquake
On 24 December 1755 around 4 o'clock after dinner, tremors were felt in Liège which repeated themselves a quarter of an hour before midnight then a few minutes later. The 1983 earthquake had no consequences.

New acquisitions 
In 1460, the chapter acquired certain buildings of the Abbey of Val-Saint-Lambert located in the villages of Ramet and Yvoz for 100 almuds of spelt to be supplied annually. In addition, he undertook to pay an annuity to the church of St. Servais of Maastricht in payment of a relief fee.

Completion of works and paintings by Lambert Lombart 

Lambert Lombart
In 1528 and 1529 several works were executed, among others paintings which according to a manuscript are the work of Lambert Lombard and his pupils.

Glass canopy
In 1530, by the munificence of Léon of Oultres, the collegiate church was enriched by the large canopy illuminating the left arm of the transept at midday. This window escaped the ravages of the French Revolution. On the contrary, the one facing it was completely destroyed.
Windows
In 1557 and 1558, major works were still carried out on the church. The first date can be found on the central window on the south side and on the vault in front of the large nave; it probably indicates the time of construction or repair of the windows on this side. The second is on the corresponding window on the north side.

Western Portal
The construction of the west portal under the tower is attributed to dean Thomas Stouten (1556 to 1564): the pediment of this portal is decorated with the arms of coat of Corneille de Berg who succeeded Erard de La Marck who died on 16 February 1538 and Robert who reigned from 1557 to 1564.

Printing workshop 
The name of dean Jean Stouten (1566-1604) is connected with the introduction of printing in Liége. The first book published in the City was the Breviarium in usum venerabilis ecclesiœ collegiatœ Sti Pauli Leodiensis issued from the press of Gautier Morberius, the first printer in Liège.

The present church started in 1289, rebuilt in 1528 was completed in 1557.

The Christ of Del Cour 
After the destruction of the dardanelle erected on the Pont des Arches in 1790, the Christ who had been above this tower since 1663, a work of Jean Del Cour, was transferred there. Since 1861, it has surmounted the interior entrance door.

French Revolution 
After the Battle of Jemappes, the French pursued the imperial army and entered into Liège. The collegiate church of St. Paul was chosen to serve as a stable and slaughterhouse and was therefore almost completely destroyed. The chapter of St. Paul suffered the fate reserved for other religious buildings by revolutionary vandals: after looting the building, removing all metals, destroying the main glass windows whose lead was used to melt bullets, selling at auction the furniture, they installed a butcher's shop for their use; the cloisters were changed into stables.

The calm restored by the triumph of the Imperials was not long-lasting. On 17 July 1794, the Convention's armies returned to Liège and the Principality was annexed to France. The following 10 December, the Executive Board decreed a 600 million loan to cover the costs of the war.

From the Collegiate Church to the Cathedral 

In 1802, the former collegiate church was erected as a cathedral and in 1805 the organs of the old Collégiale Saint-Pierre de Liège and most of the treasures of Saint Lambert's Cathedral were transported there.

Return of the relics 
On 30 December 1803, the Bishop wrote to the minister of worship Portalis asking that the government pay the fees and allowances due for the brought back from Hamburg. These six boxes contained the relics of the Saints and the debris from the treasure of Saint Lambert's Cathedral returned to the new Cathedral. One month later, on 30 January 1804, Portalis replied that the government had decided that the amount of the objects delivered to Hamburg for the service of the navy would be reimbursed but that this service being extremely overburdened by the present circumstances, it could not foresee the moment when it would be liable to pay the effects which were assigned to it. The treasure of Saint-Lambert seized in Hamburg by the commissioners of the Republic who accompanied the armies was largely sold on the orders of the 1st Consul by Commissioner Lachevadière. The sale yielded nearly a million and a half that was applied to the needs of the navy.

Compensation 
After the signature of the Concordat of 1801 and the restoration of the cult, Napoleon had the Cathedral granted a recognition of one million to be paid from the treasury of the State, but this debt was not discharged during the imperial period.

Restitution 
In 1805, in accordance with its promises, the imperial government issued a decree on 6 March of the following year, according to which the factories of the churches were granted their property, which was neither sold nor alienated. This decree allowed the new Cathedral to regain possession of part of the property and annuities it possessed before the Revolution, and on 16 September the Cathedral was given back possession of part of the property and annuities derived from the Cathédrale Notre-Dame-et-Saint-Lambert de Liège.

Translation of Saint-Lambert 

In execution of bishop Zaepffel's mandate, the translation ceremony of the bust of Saint Lambert and relics of the Saints took place on 1 January 1804. It was announced the day before by the sound of the bells of all the churches. They had been stored at Saint-Nicolas Au-Trez.

Erection of the bell tower 

The Cathedral Chapter met on 28 June 1810, to deliberate on the erection of a tower. The following day, 29 June, the Chapter decided to build the tower. to acquire for this purpose the spire of the tower of Sint-Truiden Abbey. But it was not until 1812, following a request from Napoleon, that the tower, with its ogival windows, was raised one floor and the bell tower was installed. The side facing west is pierced by a huge window with glowing mullions. The part that rises above it and contains the bells is built in sandstone from the square towers of the old cathedral of Saint-Lambert. On each of its three free sides there are two large windows with sound-absorbing panels. Its construction was completed at the end of October 1811, it replaced the original structure of the original tower, which until that time only rose to the height of the roof and was demolished in May of the same year. The framed arrowhead that ends the tower rises to a height of 90 meters. It was started immediately after the completion of the previous part and finished towards the end of August 1812. The cross which overlooks it was placed the following 1 October.

The chimes 
The chime of the former Saint Lambert's Cathedral which the imperial government had donated to the new cathedral in 1804 was placed here.

Restoration 
In the 1850s, the Cathedral underwent a major renovation by architect  .

Description

The three naves 

The collegiate church of St. Paul has the shape of a Latin Cross 84.50 meters long by 33.60 meters wide and 24 meters high under the keystone. The transept has a length of 33 meters on 11.60 meters wide. The vessel is divided into 3 naves, 2 low sides and a choir without collaterals. His architect is unknown.

The apse built in the fourteenth century in radiant style is of pentagonal form. The choir, the transept, the large nave and side naves are from the 13th century and have all the characteristics of the primary gothique. The secondary gothic is found in the transept windows, the high windows of the ship, the lateral chapels and the tower. The upper gallery, overcrowded with hooked pinnacles, is modern, like the ogival windowed floor and the spire of the bell tower, next to four bells. The lintel of the portal bears an inscription that once appeared on the seal of the city: Sancta Legia Ecclesiae Romanae Filia (Holy Liège, daughter of the Roman Church). All the red marbles in St. Paul's originate from the Rochefort Abbey, the black marbles of Dinant and the whites of Italy coming from Carrara.

The cloister 

The former chapitral cloister of the collegiate church consists of three galleries freely communicating with each other and opening into the church through two doors, one at the bottom of the building and the other adjacent to the left arm of the transept. Before the construction of the chapels on the lower sides, to add to the solidity of the building and for its embellishment, the cloister was square, and one can see the remains in the attics above these chapels. These galleries built in different periods date from the late 15th and early 16th centuries. The first part of the cloister was laid on 6 June 1445 by Daniel de Blochem. They form the three sides of a long square oriented east to the south and west, the fourth gallery is replaced by the lower left side of the collegiate church. They circumscribe a courtyard and differ from each other. The west gallery is older than the others and its ornamentation is also more meticulous, 17.50 by 4.75 metres long, it communicates with the collegiate church through a door surmounted by a great Christ in ancient wood.

Entrance to the cloister 
Next to the door that leads into the church at the north end of this gallery, a second door opens onto a beautiful gate at the foot of the tower overlooking St. Paul's Square. This charming porch is remarkable for its deep ornamental arches and its curious decoration, partly ogival. It is dated from the Renaissance. This gate, closed by an iron gate and decorated with a central stone medallion framing a high relief depicting the Conversion of Paul the Apostle placed between two low reliefs and the arabesques of the lower panels frame two small low reliefs, one on the right side representing the Nativity, the other on the left showing the Resurrection of the Savior. A series of twelve bas-reliefs represent eight framed heads and fantastic ornaments. Seven niches remained devoid of their statues. The overhanging pinion bears the arms of coat of Corneille of Berghes, bishop from 1538 to 1544.

Chapter Hall 
One enters by the cloisters on the east side in the chapel of the chapter hall. It closed the entrance of the choir where it was placed between two altars. This richly carved oak door has two panels, the side panel representing the Liège perron and the top panels sculpted to date and elegantly crafted presenting the two LG letters.

Index of artists 

A chronological list of artists who worked at St. Paul's Church or whose work is in the church.

Painters 
 Gerard Seghers (1591–1651)
 Erasmus Quellinus II (1607–1678)
 Les quatre Évangélistes
 Jean-Guillaume Carlier (1638–1675)
 Le Baptême de Jésus-Christ
 Gérard de Lairesse (1641–1711)
 1 painting
 Jean-Joseph Ansiaux (1764–1840)
 three paintings, one of which won a gold medal
  (1852–1923)
 Jean Hubert Tahan
 Le Massacre de Saint-Lambert
 Bertholet Flémal
 Three paintings
  (1821–1906)
  (1810–1884)
 Otto van Veen
 Descente de croix
 Gérard Douffet
 1 painting.

Sculptures 

 Jean Del Cour (1631-1707)
Le Christ remettant les clés à Saint Pierre, 1680 (bas-relief from the old jubé of the Collégiale Saint-Pierre de Liège dieux de saint Pierre et de saint Paul, 1680
 Statue de Jean-Baptiste, 1682 
 Christ gisant, white marble, 1696
 Christ en bronze above the main gate, northbound. This Christ was once on the Dardanelles of the Pont des Arches, on this fort built by Emperor Maximilien, to restrain the inhabitants of the noisy neighborhood of Outre-Meuse!.. 

 Guillaume Geefs (1805-1883)
 Le génie du mal sculpture represents a man of classic beauty in his physical perfection, chained, seated, and almost naked, a sheet covering his thighs. In fact, the statue of Geefs replaces a sculpture previously created by his younger brother Joseph Geefs, removed from the cathedral because of its distracting appeal and unhealthy beauty. The statue of Joseph Geefs is part of the collections of the Royal Museums of Fine Arts of Belgium.
  (1758–1835)
Mausoleum of prince-évêque Velbrück located in the cloister.

 Others 
  (1809–1871), goldsmith
 Jean-Charles Delsaux (1821–1893), architect
 Auguste Van Assche (1826–1907), architect
 Max Ingrand (1908–1969), master glassmaker

 Works transferred during the Revolution 
After the collegiate church became the new cathedral of Liège, it provided shelter and security to a whole series of works of art originating from other churches in Liège that had been demolished or closed in the revolutionary turmoil.
 from the église Saint-Jean-Baptiste:
 the Sedes sapientiae from the 13th century exposed to the front of the cathedral choir.
 the silver statuettes of goldsmith Henri de Flémal (1656, 1663, 1678) ;
 from the Church of the Wallon Jesuits :
 La Descente de croix by Gérard Seghers (1589-1651)
 from the église des Carmes déchaussés in :
 Le Baptême du Christ by Jean-Guillaume Carlier (Liège, 1638-1675) ;
 from the église des Sépulcrines, called "des Bons-Enfants" (good children):
 Le Christ gisant (1696) by Jean Del Cour
 From the former collégiale Saint-Pierre
 The two bas-reliefs of Jean Del Cour of the life of St. Peter
 from the église Notre-Dame aux Fonts:
 Saint Charles Borromée soignant les pestiférés attributed to Bertholet Flémal (Liège, 1614–1675).
 from the high altar of the ancient Cathédrale Notre-Dame-et-Saint-Lambert de Liège:
 L'Assomption by Gérard de Lairesse (1687), today transplanted in the chapel of the Blessed Sacrament of St. Paul.

 Cathedral Treasure 

The Cathedral has numerous works of art presented in eight thematic exhibition rooms with a journey through the art and history of the former Prince-Bishopric of Liège.

 Core Sources 
 Cartulary of Saint-Paul 
 1086: Foundation of the St. John the Baptist Altar in St. Paul's Church and legacy to the poor.
 Circa 1100: Charter of fraternity between the Canons of St. Paul and the Abbey of St. James, right of fishing granted to the monks of this abbey.
 1169: Charter relating to the Tithes of Lixhe
 1233: Agreement between St Lambert's Cathedral and the collegiate churches of Liège for their mutual defence
 l238: Pro piscariâ by Ramet
 1242: Dispute between the Abbey of Santiago and Humbert de Saive Chevalier, ended by the arbitration of Othon Doyen de Paul  
 1249: Founding of the altar of Notre-Dame de Saint-André and Saint-Martin  
 1251: Convention between the Abbey of Val Dieu and the Chapter of Saint Paul concerning the tithe of Froidmont
 1254: Letter from Cardinal Peter Légal of the Holy See granting indulgences to those who will contribute to the completion of the Church
 1289: Charter of Consecration of the Church (11 April)
 1293: Charter relative to the claustrale house given by the Abbey of Aulne
 1300: Indulgences granted by Pope Nicholas
 1381: Carta quod canonicus non possit habere bona Ecclesiae ad trecensum  
 1444: Erectio festi Exaltationis sanctae Crucis Daniel de Blochem canon of Saint-Paul: XIth manuscript Liber de Servis et aqua sancti Pauli.
 1483: Erectio confraternitatis beatae Mariae Virginis in Ecclesia Collegiata S. Pauli Leodiensis facta anno  1494: Fundatio primae Missae et S. Danielis in Ecclesia S. Pauli facta per Dominum Arnoldum Pickar  1515: de Cletis Foundation

 Printed sources 
 1560: Jean Stouten, dean: Ancien bréviaire de la collégiale de Saint-Paul. Premier livre imprimé de et à Liège by Gautier Morberius, currently exhibited at the Curtius Museum.
 1621: List of Altars erected in the former collegiate church of Saint-Paul.
 1622: Alber de Limborsch: Fundatio S. Pauli, printed in 4° at Ouwerx (400 hexameters)
 O.J. Thimister, Essai historique sur l'église de Saint Paul'', Spee Zelis, Liège, 1867

Bibliography

Notes and references

Notes

References

External links

 Plan of the cathedral 
 La place de la Cathédrale hier et aujourd'hui 
 The cathedral treasury, largely transferred from the predecessor cathedral 
 Architecture religieuse en occident - Fiche de la cathédrale Saint-Paul 
 Cathédrale Saint-Paul de Liège, plenum on YouTube

Roman Catholic cathedrals in Belgium
Cathédrale Saint-Paul 
Former collegiate churches in Belgium